The Curse of Man is a 1920 German film directed by Richard Eichberg and featuring Béla Lugosi, Violetta Napierska, and Lee Parry.

Series
The Curse of Man was the first of a series of two films:

Cast
 Lee Parry
 Violetta Napierska
 Robert Scholz
 Gustav Birkholz
 Willy Kaiser-Heyl
 Reinhold Pasch
 Alfred Schmasow
 Marga Köhler
 Felix Hecht
 Béla Lugosi – Reckless Saboteur

See also
 Béla Lugosi filmography

References

External links

1920 films
German black-and-white films
German silent feature films
Films of the Weimar Republic
Films directed by Richard Eichberg